Rafał Głażewski (born April 9, 1980 in Gorzów Wielkopolski) is a Polish sprint canoer who competed in the early to mid-2000s. Competing in two Summer Olympics, he earned his best finish of eighth in the K-4 1000 m event at Athens in 2004.

References
 Sports-Reference.com profile

1980 births
Canoeists at the 2000 Summer Olympics
Canoeists at the 2004 Summer Olympics
Living people
Olympic canoeists of Poland
Polish male canoeists
Sportspeople from Gorzów Wielkopolski